The SuperSPARC is a microprocessor that implements the SPARC V8 instruction set architecture (ISA) developed by Sun Microsystems. 33 and 40 MHz versions were introduced in 1992. The SuperSPARC contains 3.1 million transistors. It was fabricated by Texas Instruments (TI) at Miho, Japan in a 0.8 micrometre triple-metal BiCMOS process. 

There are two derivatives of the SuperSPARC: the SuperSPARC+ and SuperSPARC-II. The SuperSPARC+ was developed to remedy some of the design flaws that limited the SuperSPARC's clock frequency and thus performance. The SuperSPARC-II, introduced in 1994, was a major revision with improvements that enabled the microprocessor to reach 85 MHz in desktop systems and 90 MHz in the more heavily cooled SPARCserver-1000E.

SuperSPARC CPU modules are used in both the SPARCstation 10 and SPARCstation 20.

The SuperSPARC-II was replaced in 1995 by the 64-bit UltraSPARC, an implementation of the 64-bit SPARC V9 ISA.

Models

SuperSPARC (Viking)

SuperSPARC II (Voyager)

See also 
 SPARCstation 10
 SPARCstation 20

References 

 "TI SuperSPARC for Sun Station 3 in production". (11 May 1992). Electronic News.
 DeTar, Jim (10 October 1994). "Sun sets SuperSPARC-II as UltraSPARC V9 bridge". Electronic News.

SPARC microprocessors
Sun microprocessors
Texas Instruments microprocessors
32-bit microprocessors